Alfred Ambler (1 July 1879 – unknown) was an English footballer who played as a half-back. Born in Ardwick, Manchester, he played for Hyde United, Newton Heath and Colne.

External links
MUFCInfo.com profile

1879 births
Year of death missing
People from Ardwick
Footballers from Manchester
English footballers
Association football defenders
Manchester United F.C. players